Cadman Glacier is a glacier,  wide at its mouth and about  long, flowing northwestward into the head of the southern arm of Beascochea Bay south of Plas Point on the west side of the Antarctic Peninsula.

History
The glacier was discovered and roughly surveyed in 1909 by the French Antarctic Expedition under Jean-Baptiste Charcot. It was surveyed in 1935 by the British Graham Land Expedition (BGLE), led by John Rymill, and later named for John Cadman, 1st Baron Cadman of Silverdale, who contributed toward the cost of the BGLE, 1934–37.

See also
 List of glaciers in the Antarctic
 Glaciology

References 

 

Glaciers of Graham Coast